DeMaster Point is a point at the foot of Marshall Valley, Denton Hills, on the Scott Coast of Victoria Land. It was named by the Advisory Committee on Antarctic Names (1994) after Douglas P. DeMaster, a biologist at the University of Minnesota. He conducted seal studies at McMurdo Sound (1976–77), the South Shetland Islands (1977–78), and the Palmer Archipelago (1978–79).

References

Headlands of the Palmer Archipelago